A lunette, or lunula, is an liturgical item used by in the Catholic Church for the exposition of the Host.

Description

The lunette takes the form of a flat, circular container, composed of a ring of metal (usually lined with gold) holding two glass or crystal discs, which create a round, flat, glass-enclosed space for the Eucharistic Host. This is used  for exposition and Benediction services. 
The lunette, containing the consecrated Host, is placed in the centre of a vessel known as a monstrance, or ostensory, which can be mounted or carried within the church.
The lunette is often kept in another object, sometimes called a lunette or lunula case, which is usually a round box often on a small stand, serving to hold the Host upright.

The lunette resembles another liturgical object, the pyx or carrying case, but their functions are distinct; the pyx serves to transport the Host outside the church in order to take communion to an alternate venue, while the lunette remains within the church and serves to display the Host to onlookers.
All of these objects, whenever they contain a consecrated host, are normally kept within the church tabernacle when they are not in use. The tabernacle may be behind the main altar, at a side altar, or within a special Eucharistic chapel.

Notes

References
 Rev. William A O'Brien: The Sacred Vessels (2008) Biretta Books
 G Thomas Ryan: The Sacristy Manual (2011) Liturgy Training Publications 

Eucharistic objects
Artworks in metal